Gareth Meredith Griffiths (27 November 1931 – 8 December 2016) was a  international rugby union player.

Griffiths made his debut for Wales on 17 January 1953 versus England and was selected for the 1955 British Lions tour to South Africa. He played club rugby for Cardiff RFC.He played in both the Cardiff and Wales teams that defeated the New Zealand All Blacks in 1953.

References 

1931 births
2016 deaths
Barbarian F.C. players
British & Irish Lions rugby union players from Wales
Cardiff RFC players
London Welsh RFC players
Loughborough Students RUFC players
Rugby union players from Penygraig
Rugby union wings
Wales international rugby union players
Welsh rugby union players